Henry St John-Mildmay  may refer to:

Sir Henry St John-Mildmay, 3rd Baronet (1764–1808), MP for Westbury, Hampshire and Winchester
Sir Henry St John-Mildmay, 4th Baronet (1787–1848), MP for Winchester
Sir Henry St John-Mildmay, 5th Baronet (1810–1902}, British Army officer

See also
St John-Mildmay Baronets